The Saxon Class III were early, four-coupled, tender locomotives operated by the Royal Saxon State Railways for express services. The Deutsche Reichsbahn grouped these engines in 1925 into their DRG Class 34.76.

History 
The Saxon III was built in 1871 and 1872 by the Hartmann (66 examples) and the  Maschinenfabrik Esslingen (21 examples). Fourteen of the Esslingen engines were subsequently given a Nowotny-Klien bogie instead of the original fixed leading wheels and were then reclassified as the IIIb.

The Reichsbahn only took over one of the unmodified engines - no. 274 BRÜNN and number her as locomotive 34 7611.

See also 
Royal Saxon State Railways
List of Saxon locomotives and railbuses

References 

 
 

2-4-0 locomotives
03
Sächsische Maschinenfabrik locomotives
Esslingen locomotives
Railway locomotives introduced in 1871
1B n2 locomotives

Passenger locomotives